Bride is one of the seventeen parishes of the Isle of Man.

It is located in the north of the island (part of the traditional North Side division) in the sheading of Ayre.

Local government
For the purposes of local government, The whole of the historic parish forms a single parish district with Commissioners.

The Captain of the Parish (since 1981) is William Daniel Christian.

Politics
Bride parish is part of the Ayre & Michael constituency, which elects two Members to the House of Keys. Before 2016 it was in the Ayre constituency.

Geography
The parish, named after St Brigid, lies to the east of Andreas and to the north of Lezayre, bordering the sea to the north and east.

Demographics
The Isle of Man census of 2016 returned a parish population of 382, a decrease of 5% from the figure of 401 in 2011. This means that Bride is easily the lowest-populated administrative area on the island. The parish has the highest proportion of Manx Gaelic speakers on the island (4.49%), according to the 2011 census.

Topography
There is a range of sandhills crossing the parish from west to Point Cranstal (not actually a point) in the east, from which a good view may be obtained of the Manx mountains as well as of the Scottish and Cumbrian mountains (with the Solway Firth in between). Otherwise the parish is flat and low-lying. At the Point of Ayre is a  lighthouse. On old maps Point Cranstal is named as "Shellag Point" and a hamlet named Cranstal is marked close to it, but this has long since disappeared.

Telegraph cable
The first Isle of Man submarine telegraph cable to the mainland was laid from Cranstal to St Bees on the Cumberland coast in 1859. Due to damage from tidal currents the cable was later moved to Port Cornaa.

References

 Manxnotebook Bride. Details about Bride parish. 
 Manxnotebook Kirk Bride Antiquities
 Isle of Man Building Control Districts showing parish boundaries
 Isle of Man Census Report 2006

Parishes of the Isle of Man